Paulo Afonso Airport  is the airport serving Paulo Afonso, Brazil.

It is operated by the State of Bahia.

History
The airport was commissioned in 1972 and between 1980 and 2020 it was administrated by Infraero.  On November 17, 2020, the Federal Government transferred the administration of the facility to the State of Bahia.

Airlines and destinations

Access

See also

List of airports in Brazil

References

External links

Airports in Bahia
Airports established in 1972
1972 establishments in Brazil